Campbeltown was a railway station in the town of Campbeltown, Argyll and Bute, serving the town and ferry terminal. The Campbeltown and Machrihanish Light Railway was a 2 ft 3 in (686 mm) narrow gauge railway in Kintyre, Scotland, between the towns of Campbeltown and Machrihanish. Plantation Halt was the next stop on the line.

History
The station on Hall Street had no platforms and only a run round loop for the locomotive between the Old and New Quays.
Upgraded from a coal carrying mineral line and opened for passenger traffic in 1906, the railway did not have stations as such, just places where the train halted to pick up passengers. Many of the passengers were day trippers from Glasgow as a turbine steamer would bring passengers to Campbeltown early enough to catch a train to Machrihanish and allow a return journey all in one day.

Only three other passenger-carrying lines in the UK operated on the same gauge, all of them in Wales - the Corris Railway, the short-lived Plynlimon and Hafan Tramway and the Talyllyn Railway.

Notes

References

Further reading
 Farr, A. D. (1967). The Campbeltown & Machrihanish Light Railway The Oakwood Press. 
 Macmillan, Nigel S.C. (1970). The Campbeltown & Machrihanish Light Railway. Newton Abbot : David & Charles.

External links
Campbeltown and Machrahanish Railway
History of the Campbeltown and Machrahanish

Railway stations in Great Britain opened in 1906
Railway stations in Great Britain closed in 1932
Disused railway stations in Argyll and Bute
Campbeltown